The 1947 Coupe de France Final was a football match held at Stade Olympique Yves-du-Manoir, Colombes on May 11, 1947, that saw Lille OSC defeat RC Strasbourg 2–0 thanks to a goal by Roger Vandooren and an own goal of Joseph Lang.

Match details

See also
Coupe de France 1946-1947

External links
Coupe de France results at Rec.Sport.Soccer Statistics Foundation
Report on French federation site
Video at INA

Coupe
1947
Coupe De France Final 1947
Coupe De France Final 1947
Sport in Hauts-de-Seine
Coupe de France Final
Coupe de France Final